The Southern Crab Nebula (or WRAY 16-147 or  Hen 2-104) is a nebula in the constellation Centaurus.  The nebula is several thousand light years from Earth, and its central star is a symbiotic Mira variable - white dwarf pair.  It is named for its resemblance to the Crab Nebula, which is in the northern sky.

The Southern Crab was noted in a 1967 catalog, and was also observed using a CCD imager with the 2.2 meter telescope at the La Sila observatory in 1989. The 1989 observation marked a major expansion of knowledge about the nebula, and it was observed using various filters.

The nebula had already been observed using Earth-based telescopes, but images taken with the Hubble Space Telescope in 1999 have provided much more detail, revealing that at the center of the nebula are a pair of stars, a red giant and a white dwarf. It was imaged again by HST in 2019 with a newer instrument.

In 1999 it was imaged by the Hubble Space Telescope's Wide Field and Planetary Camera 2, noted for its unique "stair-step" crop and for such astrophotos as the Pillars of Creation.

The WFPC2 images were taken at an optical light wavelength of 658 nm.

The nebula was imaged again by the Hubble Space Telescope in 2019, and a set of images to celebrate the anniversary of the space telescope's launch in 1990 (29 years) by the Space Shuttle. This time a newer camera the WFC3 was used to image the nebula, at wavelengths filters of about 502, 656, 658, and 673 nanometers.

The designation  (or Hen 2-104) comes from the Henize catalog of 1967, Observations of Southern Planetary Nebulae. The catalog includes 459 items identified as planetary nebula (or likely as such). (note that in this meaning it does not imply exoplanets)

Another designation that it has been recorded for this object is WRAY-16-47.

In 2008, an investigation of the Southern Crab with its symbiotic (astronomical term) star was published. The study used imaging and spectroscopic data from space and Earth-surface telescopes including Hubble and VLT observatories. The ESO defines a symbiotic star system as "binaries in which a small hot star (white dwarf or main sequence star) orbits around a red giant star. These systems are often surrounded by an envelope of gas or dust; those with gas are known as  S-types and those with dust as  D-types."

Gallery

See also
List of Hubble anniversary images

References

External links

The "Southern Crab" Nebula (He2-104) in 1989  (captures the crab like presentation)

Centaurus (constellation)
Planetary nebulae
Emission nebulae